Heydari (also Romanized as Ḩeydarī; also known as Heidari Khor Moj) is a village in Ahram Rural District, in the Central District of Tangestan County, Bushehr Province, Iran. At the 2006 census, its population was 334, in 84 families.

References 

Populated places in Tangestan County